Fadhel M. Ghannouchi (born 1958 in Gabes, Tunisia) is a Tunisian-Canadian electrical engineer, who conducts research in radio frequency (RF) technology and wireless communications. He has held several invited positions at academic and research institutions in Europe, North America, and Japan. He has provided consulting services to a number of microwave and wireless communications companies. He is currently Professor, Alberta Innovates/the Canada Research Chair, and the Founding Director of the Intelligent RF Radio Technology Laboratory (iRadio Lab), Department of Electrical and Computer Engineering, University of Calgary, Calgary, AB.

Education 
Professor Ghannouchi obtained his B.Sc. in 1983 from Ecole Polytechnique de Montreal in (Montreal, Quebec, Canada). He completed his M.Sc. in 1984 and Ph.D. in 1987 at the University of Montreal and became a researcher at Ecole Polytechnique de Montreal.

Career 
In 1990, he was appointed Assistant Professor Ecole Polytechnqiue, Montreal, and Associate Professor and director of the Ampli Lab in 1994. In 1997, he became a Professor in the Department of Electrical Engineering and the Director of the M.Sc. in Micro-electronics program at Ecole Polytechnique de Montreal (Montreal, Canada) until 2005. In 2005, Dr. Ghannouchi joined the University of Calgary as a Professor and Research Chair at the Department of Electrical and Computer Engineering, where he founded the Intelligent RF Radio Laboratory (iRadio Lab), supported by grants from the Government of Alberta (iCORE) and the Government of Canada (Canada Research Chair) and the Canada Foundation of Innovation (CFI), as well as industrial partners. In 2005, he moved to the University of Calgary, as Professor in the Department of Electrical and Computer Engineering, holdings Tier-1 Canada Research Chair in Green Radio Systems and an Alberta Innovates Technology Futures Tier-1 strategic Chair in Intelligent Radio-Frequency (RF) Radio Technology. He is the founder and director of Calgary's Intelligent RF Radio Laboratory (iRadio Lab). He also holds an Honorary Distinguished Professorship at the Ningbo University in China, China as well as several short-term position as invited professor in several academic institutions cross Europe, Asia and Africa. Ghannouchi has supervised 60+ PhD and 40+ postdoctoral researchers. He has founded numerous spin-off companies with his collaborators and students: EMWorks (1995), Amplix (1998) [acquired by Mitec Telecom in 2001], Green Radio Technologies (2011), and AgileMIMIC (2018).

Research
Dr. Ghannouchi is well known for his contribution in the area of RF amplifier linearization using digital predistortion technique. In May 2009, Dr. Ghannouchi invented the multi-dimensional digital pre-distortion technique that eliminates the high and costly processing speed requirements of digital predistortion techniques for MIMO transmitters and for concurrent multi-band transmitters driven by carrier aggregated signals. This innovative technology is a key enabling technology for 4G and 5G wireless communications systems.

His research interests are microwave and RF instrumentation and measurements, nonlinear modelling of microwave devices and communications systems, design of power and spectrum efficient microwave amplification systems and design of intelligent RF transceivers and SDR radio systems for wireless and satellite communications and Radio over Fiber (RoF) Transceiver Design. He has over 750 referred publications with more than 550 refereed publications in IEEE journals and conferences, 25 US patents (5 pending), one Chinese patent , one Swedish patent and three Canadian patents, and multiple books in the area. His work on designing energy-efficient wireless transmitters has been featured in media outlets such as CBC Radio.

Books
W. Chen, K. Rawat, and F. M. Ghannouchi, Multiband RF Circuits and Techniques for Wireless Transmitters. Springer, 2016.
F. M. Ghannouchi, O. Hammi and M. Helaoui, Behavioral Modelling and Predistortion of Wideband Wireless Transmitters. Wiley, 2014.
F. M. Ghannouchi and M. S. Hashmi, Load-Pull Techniques with Applications to Power Amplifier Design. Springer, 2012.
A. Mohammadi and F. M. Ghannouchi, RF Transceiver Design for MIMO Wireless Communications. Springer, 2012.
F. M. Ghannouchi and A. Mohammadi, The Six-Port Technique with Microwave and Wireless Applications. Norwood, MA: Artech House, 2009.
P. Savard and F. M. Ghannouchi, L'électromagnétisme en application. Québec, Canada: Presses internationales Polytechnique, 1995.

Awards and accolades 

Fellow of the Institute of Electrical and Electronics Engineers (IEEE) in 2007
Fellow of The Institution of Engineering and Technology in 2008.
Fellow of the Engineering Institute of Canada in 2009
Fellow of the Canadian Academy of Engineering in 2009
Outstanding Leadership in Alberta Technology Award (2014) from the ASTech Foundation 
Fellow of The Royal Society of Canada (2010)
Alberta Ingenuity Fund Research Excellence Award (2009) from the Association of Professional Engineers and Geoscientists of Alberta

References

External links 
 profile at Schulich School of Engineering Profile
 iRadio Lab website
 ResearchGate page

Living people
Canadian electrical engineers
Fellows of the Canadian Academy of Engineering
1958 births
Academic staff of the University of Calgary
Fellow Members of the IEEE
Fellows of the Royal Society of Canada
Tunisian emigrants to Canada